Casa Professa may refer to:
Casa Professa (Palermo)
Casa Professa (Rome)